Józef Rysula (13 March 1939 – 23 November 2020) was a Polish cross-country skier. He competed at the 1960 Winter Olympics in Squaw Valley, the 1964 Winter Olympics in Innsbruck, and the 1968 Winter Olympics in Grenoble.

References

External links
 

1939 births
2020 deaths
Polish male cross-country skiers
Olympic cross-country skiers of Poland
Cross-country skiers at the 1960 Winter Olympics
Cross-country skiers at the 1964 Winter Olympics
Cross-country skiers at the 1968 Winter Olympics
People from Tatra County